The 1995 Pittsburgh Steelers season was the franchise's 63rd season as a professional sports franchise and as a member of the National Football League (NFL).

This season saw the Steelers return to the Super Bowl for the first time in sixteen years (Super Bowl XIV). The team's 11–5 finish was good enough for the AFC Central championship and the second seed in the conference.

For the second consecutive season, Pittsburgh hosted the AFC Championship Game, by virtue of the Indianapolis Colts' upset of the top-seeded Kansas City Chiefs at Arrowhead Stadium. 
The Steelers won the conference championship game, but lost to the Dallas Cowboys in the Super Bowl in a matchup of teams that were looking to join the San Francisco 49ers as the only other team (at the time) to win five Super Bowls. It was the first time in three Super Bowl meetings that the Steelers had lost to the Cowboys, and also their first Super Bowl loss overall. Pittsburgh coach Bill Cowher became (at the time) the youngest head coach to lead his team to the Super Bowl.

After the Super Bowl loss, quarterback Neil O'Donnell signed as a free agent with the New York Jets. The Steelers would not return to the Super Bowl until ten years later.

Offseason

NFL draft

Staff

Roster

Preseason

Schedule

Regular season

Schedule

Standings

Game summaries

Week 1 (Sunday September 3, 1995): vs. Detroit Lions

at Three Rivers Stadium, Pittsburgh, Pennsylvania

 Game time: 1:00 pm EDT
 Game weather: 78 °F (Sunny)
 Game attendance: 58,002
 Referee: Tom White
 TV announcers: (FOX) Kevin Harlan (play by play), Jerry Glanville (color commentator)

Scoring drives:

 Pittsburgh – FG Johnson 39
 Pittsburgh – FG Johnson 47
 Detroit – Perriman 5 pass from Mitchell (Hanson kick)
 Detroit – FG Hanson 43
 Pittsburgh – Morris 5 run (Johnson kick)
 Pittsburgh – Morris 1 run (Johnson kick)
 Detroit – Moore 27 pass from Mitchell (Hanson kick)
 Detroit – FG Hanson 36
 Pittsburgh – FG Johnson 31

Week 2 (Sunday September 10, 1995): at Houston Oilers

at Astrodome, Houston, Texas

 Game time: 1:00 pm EDT
 Game weather: Dome
 Game attendance: 44,122
 Referee: Bob McElwee
 TV announcers: (NBC) Dan Hicks (play by play), Tunch Ilkin (color commentator)

Scoring drives:

 Pittsburgh – Hastings 72 punt return (Johnson kick)
 Houston – FG Del Greco 43
 Pittsburgh – Bruener 15 pass from Tomczak (Johnson kick)
 Pittsburgh – FG Johnson 43
 Pittsburgh – McAfee 22 run (Johnson kick)
 Houston – Chandler 1 run (Del Greco kick)
 Pittsburgh – Lake 32 interception return (Johnson kick)
 Houston – Thomas 6 run (Del Greco kick)
 Pittsburgh – FG Johnson 40

Week 3 (Monday September 18, 1995): at Miami Dolphins

at Joe Robbie Stadium, Miami, Florida

 Game time: 9:00 pm EDT
 Game weather:
 Game attendance: 72,874
 Referee: Larry Nemmers
 TV announcers: (ABC) Al Michaels (play by play), Frank Gifford & Dan Dierdorf (color commentators), Lynn Swann (sideline reporter)

Scoring drives:

 Miami – FG Stoyanovich 37
 Miami – Parmalee 2 run (Stoyanovich kick)
 Pittsburgh – FG Johnson 40
 Miami – Kirby 28 pass from Marino (Stoyanovich kick)
 Miami – FG Stoyanovich 39
 Miami – FG Stoyanovich 21
 Pittsburgh – Mills 27 pass form Miller (Johnson kick)

Week 4 (Sunday September 24, 1995): vs. Minnesota Vikings

at Three Rivers Stadium, Pittsburgh, Pennsylvania

 Game time: 1:00 pm EDT
 Game weather: 63 °F (Partly Cloudy)
 Game attendance:  57,853
 Referee: Gordon McCarter
 TV announcers: (FOX) Kenny Albert (play by play), Anthony Muñoz (color commentator)

Scoring drives:

 Pittsburgh – FG Johnson 32
 Minnesota – R. Smith 58 run (Reveiz kick)
 Minnesota – FG Reveiz 33
 Pittsburgh – FG Johnson 35
 Minnesota – Fuller 12 fumble return (Reveiz kick)
 Minnesota – Carter 18 pass from Moon (Reveiz kick)
 Minnesota – Thomas 45 lateral from Del Rio (Reveiz kick)
 Minnesota – FG Reveiz 40
 Pittsburgh – Pegram 5 run (run failed)
 Pittsburgh – Thigpen 42 pass from Miller (pass failed)
 Minnesota – Carter 22 pass from Moon (Reveiz kick)
 Pittsburgh – Pegram 1 run (run failed)

Week 5 (Sunday October 1, 1995): vs. San Diego Chargers

at Three Rivers Stadium, Pittsburgh, Pennsylvania

 Game time: 4:00 pm EDT
 Game weather: 77 °F (Sunny)
 Game attendance: 57,012
 Referee: Gerald Austin
 TV announcers: (NBC) Dick Enberg (play by play), Phil Simms & Paul Maguire (color commentators)

Scoring drives:

 Pittsburgh – Morris 1 run (Johnson kick)
 Pittsburgh – W. Williams 63 interception return (Johnson kick)
 Pittsburgh – Mays 32 interception return (Johnson kick)
 Pittsburgh – FG Johnson 25
 San Diego – Means 13 run (pass failed)
 Pittsburgh – Morris 2 run (Johnson kick)
 San Diego – Martin 19 pass from Humphries (Carney kick)
 San Diego – FG Carney 28

Week 6 (Sunday October 8, 1995): at Jacksonville Jaguars

at Alltell Stadium, Jacksonville, Florida

 Game time: 1:00 pm EDT
 Game weather:
 Game attendance: 72,042
 Referee: Mike Carey
 TV announcers: (NBC) Don Criqui (play by play), Beasley Reece (color commentator)

Scoring drives:

 Jacksonville – Tillman 10 pass from Brunell (Hollis kick)
 Jacksonville – Stewart 6 run (Hollis kick)
 Pittsburgh – Avery 18 pass from O'Donnell (Johnson kick)
 Jacksonville – FG Hollis 53
 Pittsburgh – FG Johnson 41
 Jacksonville – FG Hollis 32
 Pittsburgh – FG Johnson 19
 Pittsburgh – FG Johnson 22

Week 7 (Sunday October 15, 1995): Bye Week

Week 8 (Thursday October 19, 1995): vs. Cincinnati Bengals

at Three Rivers Stadium, Pittsburgh, Pennsylvania

 Game time: 8:00 pm EDT
 Game weather: 63 °F (Clear)
 Game attendance: 56,684
 Referee: Gary Lane
 TV announcers: (TNT) Verne Lundquist (play by play), Pat Haden (color commentator), Craig Sager (sideline reporter)

Scoring drives:

 Cincinnati – Scott 47 pass from Blake (Pelfrey kick)
 Pittsburgh – FG Johnson 25
 Cincinnati – FG Pelfrey 31
 Cincinnati – To. McGee 12 pass from Blake (Pelfrey kick)
 Pittsburgh – FG Johnson 28
 Cincinnati – Pickens 41 pass from Blake (Pelfrey kick)
 Pittsburgh – FG N. Johnson 38
 Cincinnati – FG Pelfrey 23
 Pittsburgh – O'Donnell To Thigpen 60 yard touchdown

Week 9 (Sunday October 29, 1995): vs. Jacksonville Jaguars

at Three Rivers Stadium, Pittsburgh, Pennsylvania

 Game time: 1:00 pm EST
 Game weather: 48 °F (Partly Cloudy)
 Game attendance: 54,516
 Referee: Tom White
 TV announcers: (NBC) Don Criqui (play by play), Beasley Reece (color commentator)

Scoring drives:

 Pittsburgh – Pegram 6 run (Johnson kick)
 Pittsburgh – Thigpen 15 pass from O'Donnell (Johnson kick)
 Pittsburgh – Williams 6 pass from O'Donnell (Johnson kick)
 Jacksonville – Mitchell 16 pass from Brunell (Hollis kick)
 Pittsburgh – FG Johnson 36

Week 10 (Sunday November 5, 1995): at Chicago Bears

at Soldier Field, Chicago, Illinois

 Game time: 4:00 pm EST
 Game weather:
 Game attendance: 61,838
 Referee: Howard Roe
 TV announcers: (NBC) Dick Enberg (play by play), Phil Simms & Paul Maguire (color commentators)

Scoring drives:

 Chicago – FG Butler 40
 Pittsburgh – Pegram 1 run (Johnson kick)
 Chicago – Conway 6 pass from Kramer (Butler kick)
 Pittsburgh – FG Johnson 40
 Pittsburgh – Pegram 7 pass from O'Donnell (Johnson kick)
 Chicago – Carter 12 pass from Kramer (Butler kick)
 Chicago – Wetnight 14 pass from Kramer (Butler kick)
 Pittsburgh – FG Johnson 46
 Chicago – FG Butler 27
 Pittsburgh – Pegram 6 run (Johnson kick)
 Chicago – Minter 2 interception return (Johnson kick)
 Pittsburgh – Mills 11 pass form O'Donnell (Johnson kick)
 Pittsburgh – FG Johnson 24

Week 11 (Monday November 13, 1995): vs. Cleveland Browns

at Three Rivers Stadium, Pittsburgh, Pennsylvania

 Game time: 9:00 pm EST
 Game weather: 34 °F (Fog)
 Game attendance: 58,675
 Referee: Ron Blum
 TV announcers: (ABC) Al Michaels (play by play), Frank Gifford & Dan Dierdorf (color commentators), Lynn Swann (sideline reporter)

Scoring drives:

 Pittsburgh – Mills 2 pass from Stewart (Johnson kick)
 Cleveland – FG Stover 29
 Pittsburgh – FG Johnson 38
 Pittsburgh – FG Johnson 34
 Pittsburgh – Thigpen 9 pass from O'Donnell (Johnson kick)

Week 12 (Sunday November 19, 1995): at Cincinnati Bengals

at Riverfront Stadium, Cincinnati, Ohio

 Game time: 1:00 pm EST
 Game weather:
 Game attendance: 54,636
 Referee: Bob McElwee
 TV announcers: (NBC) Dick Enberg (play by play), Phil Simms & Paul Maguire (color commentators)

Scoring drives:

 Cincinnati – Scott 4 pass from Blake (Pelfrey kick)
 Pittsburgh – FG Johnson 50
 Cincinnati – Blake 1 run (Pelfrey kick)
 Cincinnati – Pickens 1 pass from Blake (Pelfrey kick)
 Pittsburgh – Mills 42 pass from O'Donnell (Johnson kick)
 Cincinnati – FG Pelfrey 27
 Pittsburgh – FG Johnson 26
 Cincinnati – McGee 20 pass from Blake (Pelfrey kick)
 Pittsburgh – Morris 1 run (Johnson kick)
 Pittsburgh – Hastings 15 pass from O'Donnell (Pegram run)
 Pittsburgh – Stewart 71 pass from O'Donnell (Johnson kick)
 Pittsburgh – Morris 3 run (Johnson kick)
 Pittsburgh – Morris 8 run (Johnson kick)

Week 13 (Sunday November 26, 1995): at Cleveland Browns

at Cleveland Municipal Stadium, Cleveland, Ohio

 Game time: 4:00 pm EST
 Game weather:
 Game attendance: 67,269
 Referee: Dick Hantak
 TV announcers: (NBC) Marv Albert (play by play), Phil Simms & Paul Maguire (color commentators)

Scoring drives:

 Pittsburgh – FG Johnson 33
 Pittsburgh – Bruener 12 pass from O'Donnell (Johnson kick)
 Cleveland – FG Stover 44
 Pittsburgh – Morris 1 run (Johnson kick)
 Cleveland – Jackson 11 pass from Testaverde (Stover kick)
 Cleveland – Testaverde 1 run (Stover kick)
 Pittsburgh – FG Johnson 27

Week 14 (Sunday December 3, 1995): vs. Houston Oilers

at Three Rivers Stadium, Pittsburgh, Pennsylvania

 Game time: 1:00 pm EST
 Game weather: 52 °F (Light Rain)
 Game attendance: 56,013
 Referee: Red Cashion
 TV announcers: (NBC) Marv Albert (play by play), Cris Collinsworth (color commentator)

Scoring drives:

 PIttsburgh – Thigpen 33 pass from O'Donnell (Johnson kick)
 Houston – Sanders 76 pass from Chandler (Del Greco kick)
 Pittsburgh – Bruener 7 pass from O'Donnell (Johnson kick)
 Pittsburgh – Morris 30 run (Johnson kick)

Week 15 (Sunday December 10, 1995): at Oakland Raiders

at Oakland–Alameda County Coliseum, Oakland, California

 Game time: 4:00 pm EST
 Game weather:
 Game attendance: 53,516
 Referee: Larry Nemmers
 TV announcers: (NBC) Dick Enberg (play by play), Phil Simms & Paul Maguire (color commentators)

Scoring drives:

 Pittsburgh – Mills 37 pass from O'Donnell (Johnson kick)
 Pittsburgh – FG Johnson 41
 Oakland – Bruce 1 interception return (Jaeger kick)
 Pittsburgh – FG Johnson 35
 Pittsburgh – Mills 14 pass from O'Donnell (Johnson kick)
 Oakland – FG Jaeger 39
 Pittsburgh – FG Johnson 32
 Pittsburgh – FG Johnson 20
 Pittsburgh – FG Johnson 22

Week 16 (Saturday December 16, 1995): vs. New England Patriots

at Three Rivers Stadium, Pittsburgh, Pennsylvania

 Game time: 12:30 pm EST
 Game weather: 38 °F (Sunny)
 Game attendance: 57,158
 Referee: Bernie Kukar
 TV announcers: (NBC) Tom Hammond (play by play), Bob Trumpy (color commentator)

Scoring drives:

 New England – FG Bahr 23
 Pittsburgh – FG Johnson 32
 New England – FG Bahr 22
 Pittsburgh – Thigpen 14 pass from O'Donnell (Johnson kick)
 Pittsburgh – Buckner 46 fumble return (Johnson kick)
 New England – Coates 6 pass from Bledsoe (run failed)
 Pittsburgh – Stewart 22 run (Johnson kick)
 New England – Coates 6 pass from Bledsoe (run failed)
 Pittsburgh – FG Johnson 32
 New England – Martin 22 pass from Bledsoe (Meggett pass from Bledsoe)
 Pittsburgh – Mills 62 pass from O'Donnell (Johnson kick)
 Pittsburgh – Oldham 23 fumble return (Johnson kick)

Week 17 (Sunday December 24, 1995): at Green Bay Packers

at Lambeau Field, Green Bay, Wisconsin

 Game time: 1:00 pm EST
 Game weather:
 Game attendance: 60,649
 Referee: Jerry Markbreit
 TV announcers: (NBC) Charlie Jones (play by play), Randy Cross (color commentator)

Scoring drives:

 Green Bay – Bennett 9 run (Jacke kick)
 Pittsburgh – FG Johnson 33
 Green Bay – Brooks 19 pass from Favre (Jacke kick)
 Pittsburgh – Mills 8 pass from O'Donnell (Johnson kick)
 Green Bay – Chmura 1 pass from Favre (Jacke kick)
 Pittsburgh – FG Johnson 25
 Green Bay – FG Jacke 47
 Pittsburgh – Lester 2 run (pass failed)

Playoffs

Game summaries

AFC Divisional Playoff (Saturday January 6, 1996): vs. Buffalo Bills

at Three Rivers Stadium, Pittsburgh, Pennsylvania

 Game time: 12:30 pm EST
 Game weather: 18 °F (Cloudy)
 Game attendance: 59,072
 Referee: Larry Nemmers
 TV announcers: (NBC) Marv Albert (play by play), Cris Collinsworth (color commentator), Jim Gray (sideline reporter)

Scoring drives:

 Pittsburgh – Williams 1 run (Johnson kick)
 Pittsburgh – Mills 10 pass form O'Donnell (Johnson kick)
 Pittsburgh – FG Johnson 45
 Pittsburgh – FG Johnson 38
 Buffalo – Thomas 1 run (Christie kick)
 Pittsburgh – FG Johnson 34
 Pittsburgh – FG Johnson 39
 Buffalo – Cline 2 pass from Van Pelt (Christie kick)
 Buffalo – Thomas 9 pass from Kelly (Christie kick)
 Pittsburgh – Morris 13 run (Johnson kick)
 Pittsburgh – Morris 2 run (Johnson kick)

AFC Championship Game (Sunday January 14, 1996): vs. Indianapolis Colts

at Three Rivers Stadium, Pittsburgh, Pennsylvania

 Game time: 12:30 pm EST
 Game weather: 44 °F (Sunny)
 Game attendance: 61,062
 Referee: Bernie Kukar
 TV announcers: (NBC) Dick Enberg (play by play), Phil Simms & Paul Maguire (color commentators), Jim Gray & Will McDonough (sideline reporters)

Scoring drives:

 Indianapolis – FG Blanchard 34
 Pittsburgh – FG Johnson 31
 Indianapolis – FG Blanchard 36
 Pittsburgh – Stewart 5 pass from O'Donnell (Johnson kick)
 Indianapolis – FG Blanchard 37
 Pittsburgh – FG Johnson 36
 Indianapolis – Turner 47 pass from Harbaugh (Blanchard kick)
 Pittsburgh – Morris 1 run (Johnson kick)

Super Bowl XXX (Sunday January 28, 1996): vs. Dallas Cowboys

at Sun Devil Stadium, Tempe, Arizona

 Game time: 6:20 pm EST/4:20 pm PST
 Game weather: 68 °F (Sunny)
 Game attendance: 76,347
 Referee: Red Cashion
 TV announcers: (NBC) Dick Enberg (play by play), Phil Simms & Paul Maguire (color commentators), Jim Gray & Will McDonough (sideline reporters)

Scoring drives:

 Dallas – FG Boniol 42
 Dallas – Novacek 3 pass from Aikman (Boniol kick)
 Dallas – FG Boniol 35
 Pittsburgh – Thigpen 6 pass from O'Donnell (Johnson kick)
 Dallas – E. Smith 1 run (Boniol kick)
 Pittsburgh – FG N. Johnson
 Pittsburgh – Morris 1 run (Johnson kick)
 Dallas – E. Smith 4 run (Boniol kick)

Honors and awards

Pro Bowl Representatives
See: 1996 Pro Bowl

 No. 37 Carnell Lake-Cornerback/Safety
 No. 63 Dermontti Dawson-Center
 No. 82 Yancey Thigpen-Wide Receiver
 No. 91 Kevin Greene-Outside Linebacker
 No. 95 Greg Lloyd-Outside Linebacker

References

External links
 1995 Pittsburgh Steelers season at Pro Football Reference 
 1995 Pittsburgh Steelers season statistics at jt-sw.com 

American Football Conference championship seasons
Pittsburgh Steelers seasons
Pittsburgh Steelers
AFC Central championship seasons
Pitts